The 1956 Dartmouth Indians football team was an American football team that represented Dartmouth College as a member of the Ivy League during the 1956 NCAA University Division football season. 

In their second season under head coach Bob Blackman, the Indians compiled a 5–3–1 record, and outscored opponents 122 to 89. Robert Rex was the team captain.

The Indians' 4–3 conference record tied for third place in the Ivy League. This was the first season of formal play for the league, although the Indians' previous independent schedules, dating back to the 19th century, often featured future Ivy opponents. Six of the seven Ivy matchups on Dartmouth's 1956 schedule had been present on the 1955 slate, as well (as had one of the non-conference opponents, Holy Cross).

Dartmouth played its home games at Memorial Field on the college campus in Hanover, New Hampshire.

Schedule

References

Dartmouth
Dartmouth Big Green football seasons
Dartmouth Indians football